Gulay (Gulai, Gulei) is a Bongo–Bagirmi language of Chad. An eighth of speakers are Pen (Peni), and do not like to be called Gulay.

Writing system

References

Roger Blench

External links
The Sara-Bagirmi Language Project -- Gulay

Languages of Chad
Bongo–Bagirmi languages